Dario Baccin (born 27 August 1976) is a former Italian footballer.

Club career
Baccin made his Serie A debut on 30 September against Juventus. In mid-1998 Baccin was sold to Ternana in co-ownership deal along with Corrado Grabbi for a total fee of 2.35 (short) billion lire (€1.21 million). In mid-2000 S.S.C. Napoli acquired Baccin from Ternana for 2.5 billion lire. (€1,291,142) In June 2002 Baccin was bought back by Juve. However, he was immediately sold to Libya for Al-Ittihad for €1.523 million. Just after 6 months Baccin returned to Italy for Ancona. However, he failed to play any game. In January 2004 Baccin left for Ascoli in another temporary deal. In mid-2004 Baccin left for Rimini.

After Treviso was relegated and expel from professional league, he rejoined Rimini in July 2009.

Post-playing career
After retirement, he opted to stay into football and graduated as "director of football" at the Coverciano school in December 2010. In February 2011, he was hired by Siena as a scout under experienced director of football Giorgio Perinetti, filling this role until June 2012. On 26 June 2012, he was announced to have re-united with Perinetti at Palermo, where he will serve as technical coordinator for the club's youth system.

References

External links
gazzetta.it

Al-Ittihad Club (Tripoli) players
Italian footballers
Italian expatriate footballers
Juventus F.C. players
A.C. Cesena players
A.C. ChievoVerona players
Ternana Calcio players
S.S.C. Napoli players
A.C. Ancona players
Taranto F.C. 1927 players
Ascoli Calcio 1898 F.C. players
Rimini F.C. 1912 players
Treviso F.B.C. 1993 players
Serie A players
Serie B players
Expatriate footballers in Libya
Association football defenders
People from Novara
1976 births
Living people
Libyan Premier League players
Footballers from Piedmont
Sportspeople from the Province of Novara